Chernivtsi Oblast is subdivided into districts (raions) which are further subdivided into territorial communities (hromadas).

Current

On 18 July 2020, the number of districts was reduced to three. These are:
 Chernivtsi (Чернівецький район), the center is in the city of Chernivtsi;
 Dnistrovskyi (Дністровський район), the center is in the urban-type settlement of Kelmentsi; 
 Vyzhnytsia (Вижницький район), the center is in the city of Vyzhnytsia.

Administrative divisions until 2020

Before July 2020, Chernivtsi Oblast was subdivided into 13 regions: 11 districts (raions) and 2 city municipalities (mis'krada or misto), officially known as territories governed by city councils.
Cities under the oblast's jurisdiction:
Chernivtsi (Чернівці), the administrative center of the oblast
Novodnistrovsk (Новодністровськ)
Districts (raions):
Hertsa  (Герцаївський район)
Cities under the district's jurisdiction:
Hertsa (Герца)
Hlyboka  (Глибоцький район)
Urban-type settlements under the district's jurisdiction:
Hlyboka (Глибока)
Kelmentsi  (Кельменецький район)
Urban-type settlements under the district's jurisdiction:
Kelmentsi (Кельменці)
Khotyn  (Хотинський район)
Cities under the district's jurisdiction:
Khotyn (Хотин)
Kitsman  (Кіцманський район)
Cities under the district's jurisdiction:
Kitsman (Кіцмань)
Urban-type settlements under the district's jurisdiction:
Luzhany (Лужани)
Nepolokivtsi (Неполоківці)
Novoselytsia  (Новоселицький район)
Cities under the district's jurisdiction:
Novoselytsia (Новоселиця)
Putyla  (Путильський район)
Urban-type settlements under the district's jurisdiction:
Putyla (Путила)
Sokyriany  (Сокирянський район)
Cities under the district's jurisdiction:
Sokyriany (Сокиряни)
Storozhynets  (Сторожинецький район)
Cities under the district's jurisdiction:
Storozhynets (Сторожинець)
Urban-type settlements under the district's jurisdiction:
Krasnoilsk (Красноїльськ)
Vyzhnytsia  (Вижницький район)
Cities under the district's jurisdiction:
Vashkivtsi (Вашківці)
Vyzhnytsia (Вижниця)
Urban-type settlements under the district's jurisdiction:
Berehomet (Берегомет)
Zastavna  (Заставнівський район)
Cities under the district's jurisdiction:
Zastavna (Заставна)
Urban-type settlements under the district's jurisdiction:
Kostryzhivka (Кострижівка)

References

Chernivtsi
Chernivtsi Oblast